Jordan Atkins (born 22 January 1983) is an Australian former professional rugby league footballer who last played for the London Broncos in the Super League.

Background
Atkins was born in Stanthorpe, Queensland, Australia.

Early playing career
In 2004, Atkins travelled to the United Kingdom as a member of the Australian Universities rugby league team. 

He spent the 2006 and 2007 seasons playing with the Burleigh Bears in the Queensland Cup while studying for his teaching degree at the University of Southern Queensland.

Playing career

2008-10: Career with Gold Coast
Atkins made his first-grade début against the North Queensland Cowboys in round one of the National Rugby League (NRL) 2008 season. Atkin's tally of four tries in that match equalled the standing record for most tries in an Australian first grade début set by Johnno Stuntz for Eastern Suburbs début 1908 season, which was the first match of the opening game of rugby league in Australia, and later Canterbury Bankstown's Tony Nash in the 1942 season.

2011-12: Career with Parramatta
In September 2010, Atkins signed a two-year contract with the Parramatta Eels for the 2011 and 2012 seasons.
Atkins played 12 games for Parramatta in the 2011 NRL season as the club narrowly avoided the wooden spoon.  Parramatta managed to avoid the dreaded award by beating Atkins former club the Gold Coast in the final round of the year.

London Broncos
In February 2014, Atkins signed a one-year deal to play with London Broncos in England.  Atkins retired at the end of the season.

References

External links
 Elite Athletes at USQ
 Interview with Jordan Atkins after his four-try début against the Cowboys
 Jordan Atkins at www.rleague.com

1983 births
Living people
Australian rugby league players
Gold Coast Titans players
Parramatta Eels players
Burleigh Bears players
London Broncos players
Rugby league fullbacks
Rugby league centres
Rugby league wingers
Rugby league players from Queensland
Wentworthville Magpies players